

Murals
 Berry Harvest, Don Gray
 Main Street Mural

Sculpture

 Blue, Heather Soderberg-Greene
 bronze Teddy Bear
 Crash
 Driscoll, Heather Soderberg-Greene
 Eclipse
 Family Ties
 Living Room (2001), Tamsie Ringler, installed at the Gresham Central Transit Center from 2001 to 2013
 Flying Together
 Nature and the Child
 Seeker the Raven, Rip and Chad Caswell
 Slide the Otter, Rip and Chad Caswell
 Statue of Todd Kirnan
 Strawberry
 Temples of the Air
 TriMet (1977), Robert Maki
Throne
 Vintage Style Bike Rack

References

Gresham, Oregon
Gresham
Outdoor sculptures in Gresham, Oregon
Gresham, Oregon